The Wild Duck is a 1984 Australian film directed by Henri Safran and starring Jeremy Irons and Liv Ullmann. It was adapted from the 1884 play by Henrik Ibsen, with the drama relocated to Tasmania in 1913.

Cast
Liv Ullmann as Gina
Jeremy Irons as Harold
Lucinda Jones as Henrietta
John Meillon as Major Ackland
Arthur Dignam as Gregory
Michael Pate as George
Colin Croft as Mollison
Rhys McConnochie as Dr. Roland
Marion Edward as Bertha
Peter Desalis as Peters
Jeff Truman as Johnson

See also
The Daughter, another adaptation of the play

References

External links

The Wild Duck at Oz Movies

Australian drama films
Australian films based on plays
Films based on works by Henrik Ibsen
Films directed by Henri Safran
Films set in 1913
Films about ducks
Films set in Tasmania
1980s English-language films
1980s Australian films